Carny is a 1980 American drama film about a waitress who joins a traveling carnival. It stars Gary Busey, Jodie Foster, and Robbie Robertson. It also includes an early role for Fred Ward.

Plot
Frankie and Patch are friends who work for the Great American Carnival,  a small-time carnival that tours the South. Frankie does an act as The Mighty Bozo, a character who sits in a dunk tank insulting the crowd, while Patch takes the money and runs the game. Patch is also the show's "adjuster," hence his carny name, working with the owner of the carnival, Heavy St. John, negotiating deals with local officials and representatives of the local underworld to keep the show open.

What it takes to keep the show open varies from town to town. In one town, it is making good on a city official's gambling losses on the midway and giving a city councilor a pile of free passes to the carnival. In another, it is compromising to allow the strippers to work, but keeping the freak show closed. In a third, it involves providing an underworld boss's thug with a girl he fancies. He also works to maintain harmony among the carnies. Patch is good at his job of patching together the deals that keep the carnival rolling and keeping the peace on the lot, but never likes being played for a fool.

At one stand, Donna, an independent 18-year-old bored with small-town life, strikes up a friendship with Frankie and at his invitation follows the carny onto the carnival circuit. Patch is less than happy with her presence, and would like her out of the picture. To get Patch off her back, she takes a job with the strip show as a "side girl," a backup dancer who does not actually take her clothes off. Patch plants the suggestion with Delno, the carny who runs the girlie show, that Donna wants to "work strong", i.e. be a stripper. When she is thrust onstage, she freezes and a brawl ensues. Afterwards, she covers with Heavy to keep Patch out of it, taking the blame for Patch's setting her up to fail.

Frankie gets her a job in the string joint, one of the midway games of chance, under the tutelage of Gerta. Coached in how the game works, Donna is a big success, learning how to con the marks and get their money without giving herself to them (which is what the rubes really want). After one successful scam, she winds up in bed with Patch and the two of them are caught by Frankie, which puts a strain on his relationships with both women.

While this is going on, a con run by Nails on Skeet, the local crime boss's main enforcer, goes badly wrong. Upset at losing their money, the local underworld's muscle boys wreck the Bozo Joint and kill On-Your-Mark, a carny who has been "with it" for more than fifty years and was planning to retire at the end of the season. Crime boss Marvin Dill comes after the carnival, intending to extort more money than they have already paid him. However, the carnies have had enough of his shaking them down. To avenge On-Your-Mark's death and get Dill off their backs, Patch, Frankie, Donna and Heavy run a scam on Mr. Dill involving the apparent beheading of Skeet.

The movie ends with the Great American Carnival continuing on its way, with Donna her own woman rather than Frankie's girlfriend, Frankie and Patch reconciled, and the implication that in a season or two Heavy will retire and Patch will be the one running the show.

Cast
 Gary Busey as Frankie
 Jodie Foster as Donna
 Robbie Robertson as "Patch"
 Meg Foster as Gerta
 Kenneth McMillan as "Heavy" St. John
 Elisha Cook Jr. as "On-Your-Mark"
 Tim Thomerson as "Doubles"
 Theodore Wilson as "Nails" (as Teddy Wilson)
 John Lehne as "Skeet"
 Bill McKinney as Marvin Dill
 Bert Remsen as Delno Baptiste
 Woodrow Parfrey as W.C. Hannon
 Alan Braunstein as Willie Mae
 Tina Andrews as "Sugaree"
 Craig Wasson as Mickey
 Fred Ward as Jamie
 Jordan Cael as "Flame", The Headlining Stripper
 Emmett Bejano as Alligator Skin Man
 Percilla Bejano as Monkey Girl
 Johann Petursson as Giant (as Johann Peterson)
 Pete Terhune as Fire Eating Dwarf and Iron Tongue Act
 Elaina Doucet as Anatomical Contortionist
 Jimmy Rapp as Anatomical Contortionist and Sword Swallower

Reception
Roger Ebert of the Chicago Sun-Times gave the film two stars out of four and wrote, "Carny is bursting with more information about American carnivals than it can contain, surrounding a plot too thin to support it. ...Inside this movie is a documentary struggling to get out." Gene Siskel awarded three-and-a-half stars out of four, calling Busey "superb" and stating, "There's a simple way to evaluate a film such as 'Carny,' a film so obviously in love with its subject, and that is whether it makes us want to attend a carnival. 'Carny' does." Vincent Canby of The New York Times wrote that the film had "nice performances" but was "not cohesive as it might be," because the filmmakers "appear to be unable to resist the colorful or bizarre material that leads nowhere." Variety declared, "An excitingly eccentric, nervously energetic work, 'Carny' is an intriguing look at an infrequently examined American subculture which emerges as more impressive in its various, sometimes brilliant parts than as a satisfying whole." Charles Champlin of the Los Angeles Times praised the "excellence of the acting" but thought the film ended "in a quite unsatisfactory way that leaves virtually nothing resolved and everyone compromised." Gary Arnold of The Washington Post wrote, "The material never does achieve dramatic coordination or resolution. Nevertheless, in a generous mood the seamy show-biz atmosphere may appear novel and compelling enough to justify patience with the shapeless, unfinished story."

Reviewing the film 30 years later, Dennis Swartz said, "The ambiance turns out to be much richer than the narrative, in this still intriguing misanthropic pic (freaks and outsiders against the ugly conventional world) that revels in the pleasure one gets in hustling someone at their con game."

Frederic and Mary Ann Brussat said of the movie in 2013, "Carny is a tightly structured, atmospherically rich little movie. Alex North's excellent music capitalizes on the exotic elements in the storyline. Busey is rambunctious as Frankie; Foster brings vitality to the role of Donna; and Robertson exudes a seething cynicism as Patch. Their tough, funny, and sad adventures on the road are rendered with a good mix of mystery and pathos."

References

External links

1980 films
1980 drama films
American drama films
Films about sideshow performers
1980s English-language films
Films scored by Alex North
United Artists films
Warner Bros. films
Teensploitation
1980s American films